Vitebsky Uyezd (Витебский уезд) was one of the subdivisions of the Vitebsk Governorate of the Russian Empire. It was situated in the southeastern part of the governorate. Its administrative centre was Vitebsk.

Demographics
At the time of the Russian Empire Census of 1897, Vitebsky Uyezd had a population of 177,432. Of these, 51.1% spoke Belarusian, 22.3% Yiddish, 20.1% Russian, 3.2% Polish, 2.2% Latvian, 0.7% German, 0.2% Lithuanian, 0.1% Romani and 0.1% Ukrainian as their native language.

References

 
Uezds of Vitebsk Governorate